Sven Anders Öfvergård, also known as Arga Snickaren (The Angry Carpenter) (born 3 January 1968) is a Swedish engineer, entrepreneur and television personality. He owns and runs the engineer business  A. Öfvergårds snickeri & bygg AB. He is best known for presenting the engineer and carpenting show Arga snickaren on Kanal 5. He has also owned four restaurants and bars, and worked for Lowe Brindfors. In 2014, he presented the show "Arga restaurangen" broadcast on Kanal 5, in the show he attempted to start a pop up restaurant with only inexperienced staff.

Öfvergård participated as a celebrity dancer on the TV4 show Let's Dance 2017. He also presented Fuskbyggarna on TV4. From 2018, he presented Expedition Robinson on TV4. In September 2021, TV4 announced that Öfvergård had been fired due to a scandal involving alcohol and a scuffle with a co-worker during a staff party.

Bibliography 
Öfvergård, Anders; Marmgren, Michaéla (2015). Bygga, fixa, bo : enkla projekt som gör hela skillnaden. Norstedts

References 

Living people
1968 births
Swedish television hosts
Engineers from Stockholm